The 1998 Swale Borough Council election took place on 7 May 1998 to elect members of Swale Borough Council in Kent, England. One third of the council was up for election and the council remained under no overall control.

After the election, the composition of the council was
Liberal Democrats 22
Labour 19
Conservative 7
Independent 1

Election result

References

1998
1998 English local elections
1990s in Kent